The Khyber Pakhtunkhwa Local Government Act 2013 was passed by the provincial Assembly of Khyber Pakhtunkhwa on 31 October 2013, and is published as an Act of the Provincial Legislature of the Khyber Pakhtunkhwa as No.PA/Khyber Pakhtunkhwa/Bills/2013/10518 by the Authority of Local Government Elections & Rural Development Department on 7 November 2013.

An Act; 
"to construct and regulate local government institutions in the Province of the Khyber Pakhtunkhwa and to consolidate laws relating to these institutions and to provide for matters connected therewith and ancillary thereto".

Definitions 
---In this Act, unless the context otherwise
requires,-

District 
“District” means a revenue district notified under
the West Pakistan Land Revenue Act, 1967 (W.P.
Act No. XVII of 1967);(Clause s)

Neighbourhood 
"Neighbourhood Council" means a mohallah, a group of
streets, lanes or roads, in areas with urban
characteristics, designated as Neighbourhood by
Government;(Clause f)

A Neighbourhood Council for a Neighbourhood is
areas with urban characteristics(5-f).

Village 
"Village or Village Council" means an integrated and contiguous
human habitation commonly identified by a name and includes a Dhok, Chak, Kalay(Pashto: کلے), Goth, Gaown (Urdu: گاوں), Deh, Basti or any other comparable habitation;(Section ii)

A Village Council for a village is the rural areas(5-e).

Tehsil
"Tehsil" means a Tehsil notified under the 
West Pakistan Land Revenue Act, 1967 (W.P. Act No.
XVII of 1967);(gg).

Town 
"Town" means an area notified by the Government
under section-9 to be a Town in a City District;(hh).

See also 
 Ward
 Village Council
 Neighbourhood Council 

Government of Khyber Pakhtunkhwa

References

External links
 Khber-Pakhtunkhwa-Local-Government-Act-2013.pdf
 Khber Pakhtunkhwa Local Government Official Publications
 Local Government Acts 2013 and Province-Local Government Relations
 Local Government Elections Rules
 LG bill sails through KP Assembly
 Local Government Bill 2013: New draft ensures interference by provincial govt in district affairs
 The Khyber Pakhtunkhwa Local Government (Amendment) Act,2014
 Local govts to function independently as per LG Government Act 2013, CM KPK

Government of Khyber Pakhtunkhwa
2013 in Pakistani law
Local Government Act, 2013
Local government legislation